David Hobbs may refer to:
David Hobbs (basketball) (born 1949), American basketball coach
David Hobbs (racing driver) (born 1939), British former racing driver
David Hobbs (rugby league) (born 1958), rugby league player
David Hobbs (administrator), Secretary General of the NATO Parliamentary Assembly